Grammoptera subargentata is a species of beetle in the family Cerambycidae. It was described by William Kirby in 1837.

References

Lepturinae
Beetles described in 1837